North University may refer to
North University of China
North University (Norway)